George Gatis (born 25 March 1978) is a former rugby league footballer who played as a  in the 2000s in the NRL and the Super League.

He played for the New Zealand Warriors, and the North Queensland Cowboys in two separate spells in the National Rugby League, and the Huddersfield Giants in the European Super League.

After a few overcoming injuries, Gatis quit football and took over management of his family business 'Simply Tops Seafood Bar'. This was declared the best Seafood bar in North Queensland according to the Australian Seafood Committee's (ASF) 'Best Seafood in Queensland' contest in 2016

Background
He was born in Townsville, Queensland, Australia and is of Greek heritage.

Playing career
In his junior years playing Rugby League Gatis would play for Souths Townsville and Centrals in the TDJRL.

Gatis originally played for the Wests Panthers in the Queensland Cup.

North Queensland
He made his first grade début for the North Queensland Cowboys in 2001. Gatis played 24 games for the Cowboys between 2001 and 2003.

A broken arm in 2003 followed by a knee reconstruction kept Gatis out of first-grade for several years.

New Zealand Warriors
When the New Zealand Warriors visited Townsville in 2005, assistant coach Kevin Campion offered Gatis a chance to come and spend the pre-season with the Warriors.

Gatis accepted the offer and, in 2006, he was signed by the New Zealand Warriors. He played in thirty nine games for the club over two seasons.

Huddersfield
In August 2007 Gatis signed for the Huddersfield Giants for the 2008 and 2009 seasons. However, just three months into a two-year contract with Huddersfield, George quit the club due to personal reasons.

Retirement
Gatis returned to Australia and helped his parents fish and chip shop. During the 2008 season he signed with the North Queensland Cowboys, and played one NRL match for the club, starting at hooker. For the majority of the season he played with the Northern Pride in the Queensland Cup.

Gatis retired at the end of the season.

International career
Gatis, of Greek heritage, played for the Greece national team several times in non-test fixtures. He received Greek citizenship in November 2007.

References

External links
Huddersfield Giants profile 
 

1978 births
Living people
Auckland rugby league team players
Australian rugby league players
Australian people of Greek descent
Counties Manukau rugby league team players
Huddersfield Giants players
North Queensland Cowboys players
New Zealand Warriors players
Northern Pride RLFC players
Mackay Cutters players
Rugby league hookers
Rugby league players from Townsville
Wests Panthers players